So Long So Wrong is an album by the bluegrass group Alison Krauss & Union Station, released in 1997, and the first to feature guitar and mandolin player Dan Tyminski who would replace Adam Steffey. The album reached number 4 on Billboard's Country Albums chart.

In 1998 So Long So Wrong won three Grammys: Best Country Performance by a Duo or Group with Vocal for "Looking in the Eyes of Love", Best Country Instrumental Performance for "Little Liza Jane", and Best Bluegrass Album.

Critical reception
Country Standard Time called the album "a beautiful, delicate recording," writing that "at its best, this CD shows a great band's instrumental luster and virtuosity." Rolling Stone wrote: "Music this subtle and self-effacing is rare in any category; Union Station shun both the hot-licks showboating of conventional bluegrass and the soft-rock suburbanization of contemporary country."

Track listing
 "So Long So Wrong" (Patrick Brayer, Walden Dahl) – 3:22
 "No Place to Hide" (Bob Lucas) – 3:28
 "Deeper Than Crying" (Mark Simos) – 3:07
 "I Can Let Go Now" (Michael McDonald) – 2:27
 "The Road Is a Lover" (Lucas) – 3:11
 "Little Liza Jane" (Public Domain) – 1:43
 "It Doesn't Matter" (Harley Allen) – 3:52
 "Find My Way Back to My Heart" (Simos) – 3:33
 "I'll Remember You Love in My Prayers" (Public Domain) – 3:02
 "Looking in the Eyes of Love" (Kostas Lazarides, Tricia Walker) – 4:19
 "Pain of a Troubled Life" (Ron Block) – 2:54
 "Happiness" (Michael McDonald, Viktor Krauss) – 3:55
 "Blue Trail of Sorrow" (Jeff White) – 3:39
 "There Is a Reason" (Block) – 5:35

Personnel
Alison Krauss – vocal, fiddle
Dan Tyminski – guitar, bass, vocals
Ron Block – guitar, banjo, vocals
Barry Bales – bass, vocals
Adam Steffey – mandolin, mandola, vocals

Charts

Weekly charts

Year-end charts

References

1997 albums
Alison Krauss & Union Station albums
Rounder Records albums
Grammy Award for Best Bluegrass Album